Pediasia ericella is a moth in the family Crambidae. It was described by William Barnes and James Halliday McDunnough in 1918. It is found in North America, where it has been recorded from California and Alberta. The habitat consists of prairies and aspen parklands.

The wingspan is 24–27 mm for males and 19–25 mm for females. The forewings are brown with a slight reddish tinge. The hindwings are pale smoky brown with a thin basal line.

The larvae probably feed on the roots of grasses.

References

Crambini
Moths described in 1918
Moths of North America